The second election to Merthyr Tydfil County Borough Council following the re-organization of local government in Wales was held on 6 May 1999. It was preceded by the 1995 election and followed by the 2004 election. On the same day the first elections to the Welsh Assembly were held as well as elections to the other 21 local authorities in Wales.

Labour lost thirteen seats and their majority on the council.

Overview
All council seats were up for election. These were the second elections held following local government reorganisation and the abolition of Mid Glamorgan County Council. The ward boundaries for the new authority were based on the previous Merthyr Tydfil Borough Council.

|}

Results

Bedlinog (two seats)

Cyfarthfa (three seats)

Dowlais (four seats)
Pritchard had been elected as a Labour candidate in 1995.

Gurnos (four seats)
Labour won all four seats in 1995 when Phillips had been elected as a Labour councilor for the Park ward.

Merthyr Vale (two seats)

Park (three seats)
Labour won all three seats in 1995 but one of the sitting members joined Plaid Cymru while another stood as an Independent candidate in the Gurnos ward.

Penydarren (three seats)

Plymouth (three seats)

Town (four seats)

Treharris (four seats)
Galsworthy had been elected as an Independent in 1995.

Vaynor (two seats)

References

1999
1999 Welsh local elections